The Malagasy Football Federation is the governing body of football in Madagascar. It was founded in 1961, affiliated to FIFA in 1964 and to CAF in 1963. It organizes the national football league and the national team.

On 19 March 2008, the FMF was suspended by FIFA.  On 19 May 2008, the suspension was lifted.

References

External links

 Madagascar at the FIFA website.
 Article on the FMF's involvement with FIFA's Goal Programme
  Madagascar at CAF Online

Madagascar
Football in Madagascar
Sports organizations established in 1961
Football